This is a list of films produced, co-produced, and/or distributed by Psychopathic Video.

1990s

1995
ICP's Strangle-Mania (1995, Psychopathic Video's first film)

1997
Shockumentary (1997)

1999
Strangle-Mania 2 (1999)

2000s

2000
JCW, Volume 1 (2000)
Born Twiztid: Beyond the Freakshow (2000)
Big Money Hustlas (2000, co-distributed with Island Def Jam Music Group and Non-Homogenized Productions)

2001
JCW, Volume 2 (2001)

2002
GOTJ 2002 ICP Seminar Bonus DVD (2002)
GOTJ 2002 ICP Performance Bonus DVD (2002)

2003
JCW, Volume 3 (2003)
The Purple Show (2003)
Bootlegged in L.A. (2003)

2004
Bowling Balls 3D Movie Bonus DVD (2004)
Bootlegged In Denver (Wicked Wonka Tour) Bonus DVD (2004)

2005
Behind Man's Myth Bonus DVD (2005)
GOTJ 2004 Twiztid Performance Bonus DVD (2005)

2006
Stranglemania - Collector's Edition: Volumes 1 & 2 (2006, re-release of 1995 and 1999 films)

2007
Psychopathic: The Videos (2007)
JCW: SlamTV - Episodes 1 thru 9 (2007)
JCW: SlamTV - Episodes 10 thru 15 featuring Bloodymania (2007)

2008
Hatchet Attacks: Live from Red Rocks (2008)
death racers (2008)

2009
A Family Underground (2009)

2010s

2010
Big Money Rustlas (2010)
Southern Bled (2010)
The Shaggy Show series (1999-2002; 2010)

2011
JCW at the Gathering Wrestle Reunion Edition (2011)
JCW Presents: Lights, Camera, BASH'EM (2011)
JCW Presents: Up In Smoke (2011)
JCW Presents: St. Andrew's Brawl (2011)
JCW Presents: The Pony Down Throwdown (2011)
JCW Presents: Send In The Clowns (2011)
JCW Presents: Above The Law (2011)
JCW Presents: F**k The Police (2011)
JCW Presents: Legends & Icons (2011)
JCW Presents: Bloodymania V (2011)

2012
American Psychos Tour Documentary (2012)
Insane Clown Posse Theater (Web Series) (2012–Present)

2013
2013 Juggalo Day Show: Riddle Box (w/JCW)
Insane Clown Posse Theater (TV Series) (2013–2015)

2014
Psychopathic: The Videos Vol. 2

2018
Red Fred: A Fearless Tale
(2018)
 Psychopathic The Videos Vol. 3
 X-tra Wicked Neva Twi$ted Edition

References

Psychopathic Video
Psychopathic Video films